The Guam national under-20 football team is the national association football youth team for the United States territory of Guam and is controlled by the Guam Football Association. They are affiliated with the Asian Football Confederation's East Asian Football Federation region.

Results and fixtures

2022

Current squad

The following players were called up for the 2023 AFC U-20 Asian Cup qualification, held in September 2022.

References

External links
Guam Football Association 

U20
Football in Guam
Asian national under-20 association football teams